Hsi htamin (also spelt si htamin) is a traditional Burmese snack or mont, popularly served as a breakfast dish, often served alongside peas or dried fish.

The dish consists of glutinous rice cooked with turmeric, salt, and onions, and served with roasted sesame seeds and fried onions, which renders a golden hue to the rice.

References

Burmese cuisine
Sesame dishes
Glutinous rice dishes